Claude Lutz is a French retired slalom canoeist who competed in the mid-to-late 1960s. With his wife Jarka Lutz (née Jaroslava Krčálová), he won two silver medals at the 1969 ICF Canoe Slalom World Championships in Bourg St.-Maurice (mixed C-2 event and mixed C-2 team event). He also won a bronze medal at the 1967 ICF Canoe Slalom World Championships in Lipno.

References

French male canoeists
Living people
Year of birth missing (living people)
Medalists at the ICF Canoe Slalom World Championships